Alapi is a village on the atoll of Funafuti, Tuvalu. According to 2012 census, there were 1029 inhabitants. The area of the village is 0.11 km2.

References 

Populated places in Tuvalu
Funafuti